Meja Örtengren (born 3 January 2005) is a Swedish amateur golfer. In 2022, 17 years old, she was part of the Swedish team winning the Espirito Santo Trophy and was tied individual leader. She also won her first professional event, the Swedish PGA Championship.

Career
Örtengren started playing golf at age 4 and was a licensed player by 7. She started competing at age 10 and played in her first Swedish Golf Tour event at 14, the Hoya Ladies Open at Flommen Golf Club, where she held the lead after round one.

Örtengren joined the National Team and played in the 2019 and 2020 European Young Masters. She was part of the Swedish team earning the silver medal at the 2020 European Girls' Team Championship at Hrubá Borša, Slovakia.

In 2021, she won the German Girls Open and the Annika Invitational Europe, both qualifying events for the Junior Solheim Cup. As a result, she was tapped by captain Annika Sörenstam to represent Europe at the 2021 Junior Solheim Cup, held concurrently with the 2021 Solheim Cup at Sylvania Country Club in Toledo, Ohio.

She came close to winning her first professional event at the GolfUppsala Open on the LET Access Series in August 2021, missing to join a playoff with Kajsa Arwefjäll and Sofie Bringner by one stroke to finish third. A week later, she was in contention at the Anna Nordqvist Västerås Open on the same tour after an opening round of 64, but ultimately finished tied for sixth.

Örtengren was runner-up at the French International Lady Juniors Amateur Championship in November and rounded off the season by winning the AJGA's 44th annual Rolex Tournament of Champions at PGA National Resort and Spa in Palm Beach Gardens, Florida, with a six-stroke victory over Alexa Pano.

In August 2022, Örtengren won the Espirito Santo Trophy at Le Golf National in France togerher with Ingrid Lindblad and Louise Rydqvist, where she also recorded the lowest individual score, tied with Helen Briem and Rose Zhang.

In November 2022, Örtengren successfully defended her 2021 victory at the 45th Rolex Tournament of Champions at TPC San Antonia with a of 15 under par 72-hole score of 273.

Amateur wins
2015 (2) Skandia Tour Distrikt Östergötland #5, Skandia Tour Distrikt Östergötland #6
2018 (2) Alex Norén Junior Open, Teen Cup Riksfinal F13
2019 (4) Magnus Jakobssons Memorial, Onsjö C&B Junior Open, Teen Cup Riksfinal F14, Teen Tour Final F13-16
2020 (3) Östgöta Junior Open, Teen Tour Elite #6, Swedish Golf Team Invitation
2021 (3) German Girls Open, Annika Invitational Europe, Rolex Tournament of Champions
2022 (1) Rolex Tournament of Champions

Source:

Professional wins (1)

LET Access Series wins (1)

Team appearances
Amateur
European Young Masters (representing Sweden): 2019, 2020
European Girls' Team Championship (representing Sweden): 2020, 2021, 2022
Junior Solheim Cup (representing Europe): 2021 (winners)
Junior Vagliano Trophy (representing the Continent of Europe): 2021 (winners)
Espirito Santo Trophy (representing Sweden): 2022 (winners)

Source:

References

External links
Meja Örtengren at the World Amateur Golf Rankings official site 

Swedish female golfers
Amateur golfers
Sportspeople from Östergötland County
People from Linköping Municipality
2005 births
Living people
21st-century Swedish women